Sâncraiu may refer to:

Sâncraiu, a commune in Cluj County, Romania
Sâncraiu de Mureș, a commune in Mureș County, Romania
Sâncrăieni, a commune in Harghita County, Romania
Sâncrai, a village attached to Aiud, Alba County, Romania
Sâncraiu, a village in Ilieni Commune, Covasna County, Romania
Sâncraiu Silvaniei, a village in Dobrin Commune, Sălaj County, Romania
Eriu-Sâncrai, a village in Craidorolț Commune, Satu Mare County, Romania